Peter Dennis Vuckovich (VOO-koh-vich) (born October 27, 1952) is an American former professional baseball starting pitcher who played 10 seasons in Major League Baseball (MLB) from 1975 to 1986. He came across as an intimidating presence on the mound with his 6'4" (1.93 m) 215 lb (100 kg) frame and horseshoe moustache. Vuckovich was drafted by the Chicago White Sox in 1974.

Despite a notable 12-year career as a professional baseball player, he is known mainly for his role as fictional Yankees slugger Clu Haywood, the chief nemesis of Charlie Sheen's character Ricky Vaughn, in the popular 1989 film Major League.

Vuckovich graduated from Conemaugh Valley High School then went on to Clarion University to play baseball. Nearly 30 years to the day after the Chicago White Sox drafted Vuckovich they drafted his son, Peter Vuckovich, Jr., who also attended both Conemaugh Valley High School and Clarion University, in the 48th round of the 2004 amateur draft.

Vuckovich, winner of the 1982 AL Cy Young Award, is a member of the Clarion University Sports Hall of Fame. Vuckovich is also a member of both the Western Pennsylvania Sports Hall of Fame and the Pennsylvania Sports Hall of Fame.

Vuckovich is of Serbian descent.

Baseball career
Vuckovich developed a reputation for bizarre, hyper-competitive behavior during his twelve-season career. He would fidget, twitch, pace, and convulse while on the mound. He was known to cross his eyes and stick his tongue out at batters. He would spit in his glove, scream at umpires while in the stretch, and sometimes step to the back of the mound and dry heave.

Toronto Blue Jays and St. Louis Cardinals
After minimal duty with Chicago from 1975–76, Vuckovich was selected by the Toronto Blue Jays in the 1976 MLB expansion draft. Even though the Blue Jays lost 107 games in 1977, and although mostly used in relief, Vuckovich managed a 7-7 record with eight saves. He recorded the first shutout in Toronto franchise history, a 2-0 victory over Jim Palmer and the Orioles. He also recorded the first save in Toronto franchise history on Opening Day on April 7, 1977 at Exhibition Stadium in Toronto, versus the Chicago White Sox.

Involved in a multi-player trade to the St. Louis Cardinals, Vuckovich's career went to the next level. In 1978, he started more often, winning 39 games for the Cardinals during three years. He finished third in the National League in ERA with a 2.55 mark in 1978, and ranked fourth in shutouts (3) in 1980.

Milwaukee Brewers
A part of a blockbuster seven-player trade in December 1980, Vuckovich went to the Milwaukee Brewers along with Rollie Fingers and Ted Simmons.

With the Brewers, Vuckovich continued his stellar pitching. He led the American League in wins (14) and winning percentage Win–loss % (.778) during the strike-shortened  season.

He lost Game Two of the ALCS to the Angels 4-2, and started the decisive fifth game, though not figuring in the decision. In the 1982 World Series, the Cardinals beat him 6-2 in Game Three, and he got a no-decision in the final loss.

Vuckovich skipped surgery in favor of an exercise rehabilitation. He attempted a comeback for three games, but went 0-2 in 14 innings, then missed all of 1984. Subsequent and prolonged comeback attempts all failed, and by the end of the  season, Milwaukee released Vuckovich.

In an eleven-season career, Vuckovich posted a 93-69 record with 882 strikeouts and a 3.66 ERA in 1455.1 innings pitched. In postseason play, he was 1-2 with a 3.74 ERA.

While with the Brewers, Vuckovich co-owned a bar in Milwaukee with outfielder Gorman Thomas. It was called "Stormin' & Vuke's", a play on their nicknames.

Following retirement
Following his retirement, Vuckovich worked for three years (1989–1991) as a television announcer for the Milwaukee Brewers. Vuckovich portrayed fictional Yankees slugger Clu Haywood in the film Major League.

In 1992, he was hired by the Pittsburgh Pirates as a pitching instructor. Vuckovich served as the pitching coach for the Pittsburgh Pirates for the 1997–2000 seasons. He then worked his way through the Pirates organization to the position of special assistant to the general manager with the Pirates, and held a similar post with the Seattle Mariners' organization under Jack Zduriencik, Seattle's GM from 2009–15. In 2016, Vuckovich served as a professional scout with the Arizona Diamondbacks.

See also
 List of Major League Baseball annual wins leaders

References

External links

Retrosheet.org boxscore of Toronto Blue Jays' first shutout

1952 births
Living people
American expatriate baseball players in Canada
American League wins champions
American people of Serbian descent
Arizona Diamondbacks scouts
Baseball players from Pennsylvania
Appleton Foxes players
Chicago White Sox players
Clarion Golden Eagles baseball players
Cy Young Award winners
Denver Bears players
Knoxville Sox players
Major League Baseball broadcasters
Major League Baseball pitchers
Major League Baseball pitching coaches
Milwaukee Brewers announcers
Milwaukee Brewers players
Sportspeople from Johnstown, Pennsylvania
Pittsburgh Pirates coaches
Pittsburgh Pirates executives
St. Louis Cardinals players
Seattle Mariners scouts
Toronto Blue Jays players
Vancouver Canadians players